Mi Lu Bing (literally "lost soldiers") was a Singapore-based rock band who rose to fame after winning the inaugural season of the local band competition SuperBand. The band consists of three members, Chan WeiQi, Nicodemus Lee (Nic) and Samuel Wong (Sam). The band's first album sold 5,000 copies, but its second album sold only 2,000 copies.

Members

Nic Lee (Real Name: Nicodemus Lee, Birth Date ) Nic is the guitarist of the band. In 2005, he emerged winner for Original Composition at the annual nationwide talent competition, Talent Quest. He gave up a place in Diploma in Engineering Informatics for the closest to music production, and got a Diploma in Audio Engineering at School of Audio Engineering (SAE).
Samuel Wong (Real Name: Samuel Wong Rui Xiang,) Sam is the drummer of the band and plays the guitar when performances do not require drumming and is also a freelance drums instructor. He graduated from Saint Andrew's School. 
Wei Qi (Real Name: Chan Wei Qi,) Wei Qi is the keyboardist of the band. Wei Qi studied in Chung Cheng High School and Nanyang Technological University.

Awards
Singapore Hit Awards 2007《新加坡金曲奖 2007》:
Won Best Newcomer Award 最佳新人奖
Nominated for Most Popular Newcomer 提名最受欢迎新人
Nominated for Most Popular Group 提名最受欢迎团体
Nominated for Best Composer 提名最佳本地作词《泪》
Nominated for Best Local Singer 提名最佳本地歌手奖
Nominated for Best Band 提名最佳乐团奖
Champion of SuperBand 2006 《非常SuperBand》冠军

Discography
To date, Mi Lu Bing released 3 albums and involved in 6 compilation albums :

Albums

Compilation albums
1. Best Of 非常 Superband 
2. December Stars 2006
3.《群星贺岁  金猪庆丰年》
4. December Stars 2007
5. 星光大道
6.《黄金主题曲》合辑
7.《群星贺岁 福牛迎瑞年》

References

External links
MLB's Blog
Sam's personal blog

Singaporean rock music groups
Mandopop musical groups
Singaporean boy bands
Singaporean Mandopop singers
21st-century Singaporean male  singers